Myonebrides is a genus of longhorn beetles of the subfamily Lamiinae, containing the following species:

 Myonebrides crassepunctata Breuning, 1957
 Myonebrides flavomaculata Breuning, 1969
 Myonebrides sexpunctata Breuning, 1957

References

Desmiphorini